The Zambia Masters, currently known for sponsorship reasons as the Zanaco Masters, is a golf tournament on the Sunshine Tour. It was first played in June 2014 as the Zambia Sugar Open. A tournament called the Zambia Sugar Open was played in 2013 but was a different event, the Zambia Open.

Winners

References

External links
Coverage on the Sunshine Tour's official site

Golf tournaments in Zambia
Sunshine Tour events
Recurring sporting events established in 2014
Winter events in Zambia